Bernheim Original is a wheat whiskey produced in Bardstown, Kentucky by Heaven Hill Distilleries. 
It is sold in glass in 16 oz pint bottles, glass 750ml bottles, glass 1-liter bottles.

To create this 'new American Whiskey', Heaven Hill Father and Son Master Distillers, Parker and Craig Beam developed a wheat formula with a minimum of 51% winter wheat – the recipe also includes corn and malted barley. The initial run was distilled in January 2000 and the label has since received considerable acclaim. ”

External links
 Official site

Wheat whisky
Bardstown, Kentucky
Alcoholic drink brands
American brands